Hultin is a Swedish surname. Notable people with the surname include:

Göran Hultin (1897–1949), Swedish athlete
Jerry MacArthur Hultin (born 1942), United States Navy officer
Johan Hultin (born 1924), Swedish-American pathologist
Katie Hultin (born 1982), American women's soccer player
Randi Hultin (1926–2000), Norwegian journalist and critic

Swedish-language surnames